is a longtime studio executive and former chairman of Toho Co., Ltd. The grandson of Toho founder Ichizō Kobayashi, he is a graduate of the prestigious Konan University. Matsuoka served as Chairman of the Toho Co., Ltd., for 14 years until his retirement in 2009. He had previously served as President and worked for the company for over 50 years having joined in 1957.

Matsuoka is credited with helping establish Toho as the preeminent film production, distribution and exhibition company in Japan with his revolutionary and innovative reforms. Established in 1932, Toho is known internationally for its Godzilla series and the Akira Kurosawa classics such as Seven Samurai, Yojimbo, and Kagemusha.

Mr Matsuoka was awarded a Lifetime Achievement Award by the National Association of Theatre Owners at ShoWest in 2007, and the FIAPF Award for outstanding achievement in film at the 2009 Asia Pacific Screen Awards.

He has 2 sons, Shuzo Matsuoka, a former professional tennis player, and Hiroyasu Matsuoka, who followed his father into the film business and currently serves as the International Head and Head of Movie Sales & Film Division at Toho Co. Ltd.

References

External links

Toho Co. Toho official webpage (in Japanese)

Film studio executives
Japanese businesspeople
1934 births
Living people